Mal Hallett (born 1893, Roxbury, Massachusetts – died November 20, 1952, Boston) was an American jazz violinist and bandleader.

Biography
Hallett was a graduate of the Boston Conservatory of Music. He played in France during World War I as a member of Al Moore's orchestra, and led his own band, primarily in New England, for much of the 1930s. His ensemble featured a large number of sidemen who went on to become noted for their own achievements, including Gene Krupa, Jack Teagarden, Frankie Carle, Jack Jenney, Toots Mondello, Irene Daye, Floyd O'Brien, Spud Murphy, Boots Mussulli, Brad Gowans, Turk Murphy, Teddy Grace, John Williams, and Don Fagerquist.

Hallett was an older swing bandleader, and had trouble winning over younger fans, to the detriment of his career. He also battled alcoholism for much of his life, and an arm injury incurred while drunk prevented him from playing violin late in life. He died in 1952 in Boston.

References
Mal Hallett at Solid!
American Big Bands Database - H with entry on Hallett

Further reading
Obituary, New York Times, November 22, 1952 (subscription access required)

American jazz violinists
American male violinists
American jazz bandleaders
Big band bandleaders
1952 deaths
1893 births
20th-century American conductors (music)
20th-century American violinists
20th-century American male musicians
American male jazz musicians